Mayes House is a historic home located at Charlotte, Mecklenburg County, North Carolina.  It was built about 1902, and is a two-story, Shingle Style frame dwelling.  The house has a cross-gambrel slate roof, raised brick basement, projecting bays, and a front porch. It is currently being used as an office building.

It was listed on the National Register of Historic Places in 1993.

References

Houses on the National Register of Historic Places in North Carolina
Shingle Style architecture in North Carolina
Houses completed in 1902
Houses in Charlotte, North Carolina
National Register of Historic Places in Mecklenburg County, North Carolina